Philippe Aw Thiam Hor is a Singapore professional football coach and former player who is former head coach of S.League club Young Lions FC.

Aw played mostly as a winger throughout his footballing career and spent the majority of his professional career with Home United in the S.League.

Early life 
Aw started off in his youth experimenting with many different sports, initially focusing on badminton, before switching to football. He went to Toh Tuck Secondary School where he played football, before moving to join the school team of Chestnut Drive Secondary School after the former institute closed down. Aw subsequently joined and captained the school football team of Ngee Ann Polytechnic in his third year of tertiary education, leading them to achieve the title of Inter-Varsity Polytechnic (IVP) champions in that year. Under the recommendation of his teammate Lim Soon Seng, who at that time played for Tiong Bahru in the Singapore National Football League Division One, Aw joined the amateur league side for training and represented the team competitively.

Club career 
In 1998, after coaches P. N. Sivaji and Arasu, who managed Aw at Tiong Bahru, moved to join Balestier Khalsa, they brought him along and signed him on professional terms to play for the club. Aw made his debut the same year. The following year, after Aw had graduated from Ngee Ann Polytechnic, he joined Home United while serving in the Singapore Police Force for his mandatory national service. After staying with the club for four S.League seasons, Aw left to pursue his career as a full-time police officer, while playing for Police SA in the Singapore National Football League, until he retired from football by the end of 2006.

Coaching career 
In 2007, at the offer of Home United's Prime League coach Bernard Lim following his resignation from his job as a police officer, Aw rejoined Home United in a youth coaching role at the club's Centre of Excellence, where he focused on growing the talent pool of young footballers. He served in that capacity for six years spanning from 2007 till the end of 2012. The following year, Aw served as the club's Prime League coach, guiding them to be crowned as the 2014 Prime League champions. Towards the end of 2014, Aw was offered the managerial role after his predecessor, South Korean manager Lee Lim-saeng had left.

Following Aw's induction as the manager of Home United, he set out to introduce an attractive brand of football, as well as promoting young players from the club's reserves to play for the senior team. In the 2015 S.League season, Aw promoted several youngsters from the club's youth academy to the first team,  such as R. Aaravin, Shahrin Saberin and Sufianto Salleh.

On 8 April 2016, Aw was named by the Football Association of Singapore to lead the Singapore Selection side that would participate in the 2016 Sultan of Selangor Cup. Home United players such as Abdil Qaiyyim Mutalib and Azhar Sairudin were selected in the 18-men Singapore side, which also featured foreign S.League players including Ken Ilsø and Stipe Plazibat. The cup fixture eventually ended in a 1–1 (3–4 on penalties) win for the Singapore Selection side, despite Singapore defender Shahrin Saberin being sent off for a second yellow card in the 54th minute.

Head coach Philippe Aw has been relieved of his duties with immediate effect and Assistant coach Clement Teo has been installed as caretaker coach as reported by FOX Sports Asia in an article.

Career statistics

Managerial

Honours

Player

Club

Home United 
 S.League
 Winner: 1999
 Singapore Cup
 Winner: 2000, 2001

Manager

Club

Home United 
 Singapore Cup
 Runner-up: 2015
Prime League
Winner: 2014

International 
 Sultan of Selangor Cup
 Winner: 2016

References

External links 
 

Year of birth missing (living people)
Living people
Singaporean footballers
Singaporean sportspeople of Chinese descent
Singaporean football managers
Balestier Khalsa FC players
Home United FC players
Singapore Premier League players
Association football wingers
Home United FC head coaches
Hougang United FC head coaches